Bowman is a city and county seat of Bowman County, North Dakota, United States. The population was 1,470 at the 2020 census.

History
Bowman was founded in 1907 at about the same time the railroad was extended to that point. The city took its name from Bowman County. A post office has been in operation at Bowman since 1907.

Geography

Bowman is located at  (46.181791, −103.400211).

Climate

According to the Köppen Climate Classification system, Bowman has a semi-arid climate, abbreviated BSk on climate maps, although it closely borders the state’s more typical humid continental climate (Dfb).

Demographics

2010 census
As of the census of 2010, there were 1,650 people, 760 households, and 422 families living in the city. The racial makeup of the city was 97.7% White, 0.2% Native American, 0.1% Asian, 1.5% from other races, and 0.5% from two or more races. Hispanic or Latino of any race were 3.9% of the population.

There were 760 households, of which 22.9% had children under the age of 18 living with them, 46.4% were married couples living together, 5.4% had a female householder with no husband present, 3.7% had a male householder with no wife present, and 44.5% were non-families. 39.3% of all households were made up of individuals, and 19.9% had someone living alone who was 65 years of age or older. The average household size was 2.06 and the average family size was 2.77.

The median age in the city was 48.4 years. 19.1% of residents were under the age of 18; 6.8% were between the ages of 18 and 24; 19.9% were from 25 to 44; 27.5% were from 45 to 64; and 26.7% were 65 years of age or older. The gender makeup of the city was 48.5% male and 51.5% female.

2000 census
As of the census of 2000, there were 1,600 people, 702 households, and 419 families living in the city. The population density was 1,227.8 people per square mile (475.2/km). There were 799 housing units at an average density of 613.2 per square mile (237.3/km). The racial makeup of the city was 99.12% White, 0.12% Native American, 0.12% from other races, and 0.62% from two or more races. Hispanic or Latino of any race were 0.75% of the population.

There were 702 households, out of which 25.9% had children under the age of 18 living with them, 51.3% were married couples living together, 6.1% had a female householder with no husband present, and 40.3% were non-families. 37.5% of all households were made up of individuals, and 21.1% had someone living alone who was 65 years of age or older. The average household size was 2.15 and the average family size was 2.84.

In the city, the population was spread out, with 21.7% under the age of 18, 5.2% from 18 to 24, 23.8% from 25 to 44, 22.5% from 45 to 64, and 26.9% who were 65 years of age or older. The median age was 45 years. For every 100 females, there were 91.2 males. For every 100 females age 18 and over, there were 89.6 males.

The median income for a household in the city was $31,645, and the median income for a family was $41,131. Males had a median income of $28,824 versus $19,688 for females. The per capita income for the city was $18,851. About 5.4% of families and 7.5% of the population were below the poverty line, including 8.2% of those under age 18 and 9.6% of those age 65 or over.

Education
The city is home to Bowman County School District 1, which operates Bowman County High School.

Radio
 KPOK (1340 AM)

Notable people
 Shaun Sipma, current Mayor of Minot, North Dakota
 Chris Tuchscherer, mixed martial arts and UFC fighter

References

External links
 
 City of Bowman

Cities in Bowman County, North Dakota
Cities in North Dakota
County seats in North Dakota
Populated places established in 1907
1907 establishments in North Dakota